Cornelis de Vries (16 August 1740, Koog aan de Zaan – 21 November 1812, Haarlem), was a Mennonite minister.

Biography
He was educated at the Amsterdam Mennonite seminary and served the congregations of Enschede 1763-1771 and Utrecht 1771-1786, where he started the Utrechtse Courant in 1782, a newspaper he edited himself. He then retired to devote more time to writing and studies and moved to Haarlem in 1788. There he became friendly with Adriaan Loosjes, with whom he started the Algemeene Konst- en Letterbode voor meer of min geoefenden. He first married Alida Reesen, and after she died he married Maria Elisabeth van Vollenhove (1730–1811), the widow of the Remonstrant pastor Jan Verbeek, one of the founding members of Teylers First Society, which he joined himself from 1792.
He wrote several religious works, including a catechism for children.

References

 Cornelis de Vries author page on DBNL

1740 births
1812 deaths
Mennonite ministers
People from Zaanstad
Members of Teylers Eerste Genootschap
Dutch writers
19th-century Anabaptist ministers